The Clinch Ranger District Cluster is a region in the George Washington and Jefferson National Forests recognized by The Wilderness Society for its rich biodiversity and rugged scenery.  It offers a unique habitat for rare plants, salamanders and other rare species.

Description
The region includes wilderness areas protected by Congressional action, as well as inventoried wilderness and uninventoried areas recognized by the Wilderness Society as worthy of protection from timbering and roads. 
The cluster contains the following areas, all within the Clinch Ranger District of the George Washington and Jefferson National Forests:
Northern section of the Clinch Ranger District
Stone Mountain Wilderness
North Fork of the Pound
Southern section
Little Laurel Branch
Roaring Branch
Little Stony Creek
Devils Fork (conservation area)
Laurel Fork (conservation area)

Location and access
The Clinch Ranger District is divided into two parts, the northern section parallels Pine Mountain and the southern section follows Powell Mountain.  US Highway 23 runs between the two sections.  Other roads and trails in the area are shown on National Geographic Map 793, Clinch Ranger District.

Geologic history
The Clinch Ranger District lies in the Alleghany Plateau, a highly dissected plateau composed of relatively flat-lying bedrock of Mississippian and Pennsylvania age.  In places the dissection is so pronounced that the area has the appearance of mountains.  But compared to the Ridge and Valley Province to the east with long uplifted ridges, the mountains are in random directions formed by the erosion of streams into deep, narrow valleys leaving rugged mountains.  The Russell Fork River is an example of formations in the Plateau with almost 1000-foot-deep gorge and striking erosional features with descriptive names such as the Palisades, The Towers, and The Chimneys.
.

The horizontal layering of the Plateau, seen in road cuts and rocky cliffs in river gorges, contrasts with the tilted up thrusts in the Ridge and Valley province on the east.  Seams of high-quality coal led to mining beginning in the late 1800s.

Natural history
Clusters of wild areas, such as the Clinch Ranger District Cluster, are important for the maintenance of biological diversity. A natural landscape contains a blend of ecosystems—mountain slopes, moist areas, soil types, temperatures—over which species can roam in their search for mates, foraging for food, and the avoidance of predators and other stress-inducing hazards. The construction of roads breaks up the landscape into islands which limit the free migration of forest species. Such edge effects have been shown to minimize the diversity required for the maintenance of a rich biological habitat.

The bird population is also affected by the division of undisturbed forest into islands with edges defined by roads. Predators of birds, such as raccoons, snakes, skunks, house cats and egg-eating crows and blue jays, are often found at forest edges. And roads provide a pathway for Brown-headed cowbirds in their search for the location of nests of smaller birds, who then destroy  the eggs and replace them with their own eggs leaving the unwitting  owner to raise the cowbird hatchlings.

The Plateau Province is covered by a  complex forest composed of northern hardwood interspersed with conifers.  The southern Appalachians contain more plant species than anywhere else in North America since the region was a refuge for many species when glaciers covered the northern part of the hemisphere.  In modern times, game species disappeared after widespread hunting, but with the beginning of game management many species have begun to recover to the extent that animals such as black bear, deer and turkeys can be found.

The watershed for the cluster contains many endangered fresh_water mussel species.  The identified species has been reduced from 60 to about 40, with 26 listed by the Nature Conservancy as globally rare.

Clinch Ranger District
The Clinch Ranger District Cluster lies within the Clinch Ranger District of the George Washington and Jefferson National Forest.  To protect the headwaters of the Tennessee Valley drainage from flooding caused by timbering and the stripping of whole mountains by mining, the US Forest Service purchased the Clinch Range District in 1936.

Other clusters 
Other clusters of the Wilderness Society's "Mountain Treasures" in the Jefferson National Forest (north to south):

Glenwood Cluster
Craig Creek Cluster
Barbours Creek-Shawvers Run Cluster
Sinking Creek Valley Cluster
Mountain Lake Wilderness Cluster
Angels Rest Cluster
Walker Mountain Cluster
Kimberling Creek Cluster
Garden Mountain Cluster
Mount Rogers Cluster

See also
Maps of region:
USGS Bristol 1:100,000 scale topographic map
USGS Pikeville 1:100,000 scale topographic map
Nature Conservancy, Clinch Valley

References

Further reading
Stephenson, Steven L., A Natural History of the Central Appalachians, 2013, West Virginia University Press, West Virginia, .
Davis, Donald Edward, Where There Are Mountains, An Environmental History of the Southern Appalachians, 2000, University of Georgia Press, Athens, Georgia. .

External links
 George Washington and Jefferson National Forest
 Geology of Virginia map
 Clinch Coalition
 Nature Conservancy's Cumberland Forest Project

George Washington and Jefferson National Forests